Alison Riske was the defending champion, but lost in the second round to Tímea Babos.

Agnieszka Radwańska won the title, defeating Danka Kovinić in the final, 6–1, 6–2.

Nicole Vaidisova played her final WTA tournament here, losing as a qualifier in the first round.

Seeds

Draw

Finals

Top half

Bottom half

Qualifying

Seeds

Qualifiers

Draw

First qualifier

Second qualifier

Third qualifier

Fourth qualifier

References
Main Draw
Qualifying Draw

Tianjin Open - Singles
Tianjin Open